Shanxi Xishan Coal and Electricity Power Co., Ltd. was established in 1999 and listed on the Shenzhen Stock Exchange in 2000. It has 9 coal mines, 8 coal plants and 13 holding companies.

Xishan Coal Electricity Group was the parent company of Xishan Coal and Electricity Power. However, they were now both subsidiary (in the same tier) of Shanxi Coking Coal Group.

Xishan Coal and Electricity Power became a constituent of SZSE 100 Index in January 2017.

References

External links

 

Coal companies of China
Government-owned companies of China
Companies based in Taiyuan
Energy companies established in 1999
Non-renewable resource companies established in 1999
Chinese companies established in 1999
Companies listed on the Shenzhen Stock Exchange